Doric Germain (born 1946 in Lac-Sainte-Thérèse, Ontario) is a Canadian writer and university professor.

Educated at the University of Ottawa and Université Laval, he briefly taught high school before publishing his first novel in 1980. He is currently a professor of French literature at Laurentian University's Université de Hearst.

Works
 La Vengeance de l'orignal (1980)
 Le Trappeur du Kabi (1981)
 Poison (1985)
 Le soleil se lève au Nord (1991)
 Défenses légitimes (2003)

External links
 Doric Germain

1946 births
Canadian male novelists
Franco-Ontarian people
Academic staff of Laurentian University
People from Hearst, Ontario
Living people
Canadian novelists in French